Marilia is a genus of mortarjoint casemakers in the family Odontoceridae. There are at least 40 described species in Marilia.

The type species for Marilia is Marilia major F. Mueller.

Species
These 46 species belong to the genus Marilia:

 Marilia aerope Malicky & Chantaramongkol, 1996 i c g
 Marilia alata Flint, 1974 i c g
 Marilia albicornis (Burmeister, 1839) i c g
 Marilia albofusca Schmid, 1959 i c g
 Marilia amnicola Flint, 1968 i c g
 Marilia biloba Flint, 1974 i c g
 Marilia bola Mosely in Mosely & Kimmins, 1953 i c g
 Marilia cinerea Navás, 1931 i c g
 Marilia crea Mosely, 1949 i c g
 Marilia discaulis g
 Marilia eleutheria Flint, 1983 i c g
 Marilia elongata Martynov, 1912 i c g
 Marilia fasiculata Banks, 1913 i c g
 Marilia flexuosa Ulmer, 1905 i c g b
 Marilia fusca Kimmins in Mosely & Kimmins, 1953 i c g
 Marilia gigas Flint, 1991 i c g
 Marilia gracilis Banks, 1938 i c g
 Marilia guaira Flint, 1983 i c g
 Marilia humerosa Flint, 1983 i c g
 Marilia infundibulum Flint, 1983 i c g
 Marilia javana Ulmer, 1951 i c g
 Marilia lata Ulmer, 1926 i c g
 Marilia lateralis Flint, 1983 i c g
 Marilia mahedae Neto, Pes & Hamada, 2017 g
 Marilia major Mueller, 1880 i c g
 Marilia megalopos g
 Marilia mexicana (Banks, 1901) i c g
 Marilia microps Flint, 1991 i c g
 Marilia minor Mueller, 1880 i c g
 Marilia misionensis Flint, 1983 i c g
 Marilia mixta (Hagen, 1858) i c g
 Marilia modesta Banks, 1913 i c g
 Marilia mogtiana Malicky, 1989 i c g
 Marilia nebulosa Ulmer, 1951 i c g
 Marilia nobsca Milne, 1936 i c g
 Marilia parallela Hwang, 1957 i c g
 Marilia qinlingensis g
 Marilia salta Flint, 1983 i c g
 Marilia scudderi Banks, 1924 i c g
 Marilia simulans Forsslund, 1935 i c g
 Marilia siolii Marlier, 1964 i c g
 Marilia spinosula Flint, 1996 i c g
 Marilia sumatrana Ulmer, 1951 i c g
 Marilia triangularis Flint, 1983 i c g
 Marilia truncata Flint, 1983 i c g
 Marilia wrighti Banks, 1924 i c g

Data sources: i = ITIS, c = Catalogue of Life, g = GBIF, b = Bugguide.net

References

Further reading

 
 
 

Trichoptera genera
Articles created by Qbugbot
Integripalpia